The Albay Vulcans is a Philippine rugby union and rugby league team based in Legazpi, Albay. They played in the Philippines National Rugby League Championship.

Name and Emblem
They are named after the active Mayon Volcano which overlooks Legazpi.

History
The club was founded by Ric Raymond Bellen initially formed as a rugby league club they shifted to playing rugby union but with support from the PNRL (Philippines National Rugby League) they were able to organise a home game at the Bicol University sports field against the Manila Storm in which they lost 30-14.

Current squad
Marlon Dela Cruz
Jaineil Marbella
William Kila
Jemison Pastor
Rafael Monday
Joseph Alindogan
Kevin Santos
Louis Jiano Aboga
Joey Salceda
Matthew Frick
LRay Villafuerte
Joeffrey Alamil
Deo Pineda
Niel Soria
Reymond Bernal
Athanasius Igag
Renz Balmedina
Emmanuel Moramul
Phillip Tibong

References

Philippines National Rugby League teams
Sports in Albay
Rugby clubs established in 2015